Kal is both a given name and a surname. Notable people with the name include:

Given name:
 Kal Daniels (born 1963), former Major League Baseball outfielder
 Kal Mann (1917–2001), American lyricist
 Kal Naismith (born 1992), Scottish footballer
 Kal Penn (born 1977), American actor, producer and civil servant, best known for the TV series House and the Harold and Kumar films

Surname:
 Jan Kal (born 1946), Dutch poet
 Miraç Kal (born 1987), Turkish cyclist
 Paulus Kal, 15th-century German fencing master
 Paweł Kal (born 1989), Polish footballer